The 2021 El Paso Locomotive FC season was the third season for El Paso Locomotive FC in the USL Championship (USL-C), the second-tier professional soccer league in the United States and Canada. El Paso Locomotive FC also participates in the U.S. Open Cup and competes with all other professional teams in Texas in the Copa Tejas.

Club

Roster

Competitions

USL Championship

Standings — Western Conference

Match results

USL Championship Playoffs

U.S. Open Cup 

The 2021 U.S. Open Cup was cancelled due to COVID-19.

References

El Paso Locomotive FC
El Paso
El Paso
El Paso Locomotive